SS Ismailia was a British cargo and passenger ship of the Anchor Line which disappeared in the Atlantic Ocean in 1873.

Ship history
The ship was built by the Robert Duncan & Co. shipyard in Port Glasgow, and was launched on 30 June 1870.

She sailed from New York City on 30 September 1873 carrying wheat and general cargo, with 52 people (44 crew and 8 passengers) aboard, en route for Glasgow. She was seen on 2 October, but then disappeared, and was never seen again.

References

1870 ships
Ships built on the River Clyde
Maritime incidents in October 1873
Missing ships
Ships lost with all hands
1870 establishments in Scotland